Felaheen may mean:
The plural of fellah, a class roughly equal to peasant in the Middle East and North Africa
Felaheen is the third novel in Jon Courtenay Grimwood's Arabesk trilogy